Lee Jin-yong (born 1 May 2001) is a South Korean football defender, who plays for Daegu FC in the K League 1, the highest tier of professional football in South Korea.

Club career
Born on 1 May 2001 in Daegu, Lee made his debut for Daegu FC on 10 March 2021, playing against Gwangju FC in the K League 1.

Club career statistics

Honors and awards

Player
Daegu FC
 Korean FA Cup Runner-up (1) : 2021

References

2001 births
Living people
Association football defenders
South Korean footballers
Daegu FC players
K League 1 players
Sportspeople from Daegu